The 1914 Copa del Rey Final was the 14th final of the Spanish cup competition, the Copa del Rey. The final was played at Costorbe in Irun on 10 May 1914. The match was won by Athletic Bilbao, who beat España FC 2–1. The star of the match was Severino Zuazo, who scored the 2 goals that gave the Cup to Bilbao, while Jaime Villena reduced the deficit for Vigo with 2 minutes remaining.

Details

References

External links
linguasport.com
RSSSF.com

1914
Copa
Athletic Bilbao matches
FC Espanya de Barcelona matches